GNC Holdings, LLC (abbreviated GNC; alternatively General Nutrition Centers) is a retail company based in Pittsburgh, Pennsylvania. It specializes in health and nutrition related products, including vitamins, supplements, minerals, herbs, sports nutrition, diet, and energy products.

In 2020, Harbin Pharmaceutical Group, a Chinese state-owned pharmaceutical manufacturer, acquired the company.

History

In 1935, David Shakarian opened a small health food store, Lackzoom, in downtown Pittsburgh. He made US$35 on his first day and was able to open a second store within six months. A year later, Shakarian suffered from what appeared to be a fatal blow when the Ohio River flooded into downtown on St. Patrick's Day. Both of his stores were wiped out. But he opened a new store the next year and later began a mail-order business, shipping health foods and later vitamins and prescription drugs throughout the country. Major expansion began in the 1960s. Shakarian said the physical fitness movement, anxiety about smoking and the growth shopping centers brought success to his business venture.

In the 1960s, the company changed the name of its stores to General Nutrition Centers. Shakarian stepped down as chief executive officer in February 1984 but continued as chairman until his death later that year.

Shakarian took GNC public (listed on the NYSE) in the 1980s. Gary Daum was named chief executive office in February 1984. In May 1985, Jerry Horn took on the role. GNC was taken private and sold to Thomas H. Lee Partners a PE investment/management fund in the late 1980s. Thomas Lee ran GNC and took it public prior to selling the company to Royal Dutch Numico and Numico acquired GNC in 1999; it sold GNC to Apollo Management in 2003. Ontario Teachers' Pension Plan and Ares Management bought GNC in 2007. GNC went public in 2011.

In 1990, the company considered relocating but a public/private effort retained GNC headquarters in Downtown Pittsburgh.

In 2018, the Chinese state-owned Harbin Pharmaceutical Group agreed to acquire an approximately 40% stake in GNC. In September 2020, Senator Marco Rubio asked the Committee on Foreign Investment in the United States to examine the proposed acquisition on data protection and national security grounds.

In November 2018, the company announced they would be closing up to 900 stores over 3 years. In July 2019, it was announced that they planned to close up to 1,400 company owned retail locations, primarily those located within shopping malls.

In June 2020, GNC filed for Chapter 11 bankruptcy protection and indicated plans to close at least 800 stores. Effective on June 30, 2020, the stock was delisted from the New York Stock Exchange and shifted to the OTC Markets Group. In September 2020, the bankruptcy court in Delaware approved the sale of GNC for $770 million to Harbin Pharmaceutical Group.

The company emerged from the Chapter 11 process under the new ownership of Harbin Pharmaceutical Group in October 2020. In 2021, GNC revealed that Josh Burris will take over as CEO and Cam Lawrence as CFO. 

In 2021, GNC announced a partnership with Walmart for a selection of GNC specific products.

Retail and online stores

GNC stores typically stock a wide range of weight loss, bodybuilding, nutritional supplements, vitamins, natural remedies, and health and beauty products, in both its owned brands as well as third-party brands. Its products are also sold on GNC.com and, as of January 2017, on GNC's Amazon Marketplace.

On December 31, 2018, GNC had approximately 8,400 locations, of which approximately 6,200 were in the United States (including approximately 2,200 Rite Aid licensed store-within-a-store locations), as well as franchise operations in approximately 50 countries.

Of GNC's approximately 4,100 U.S. locations in 2019, 61% were in strip malls and 28% were in larger malls.

Lawsuits
In 1998, GNC was accused of purposely running its franchisees out of business in order to "retake" the stores into corporate control. An April 30, 2003, article states that the GNC corporate company was sued by numerous franchise owners. The complaint is that the parent company was allowing their corporate owned stores to sell products for less than the franchise stores are allowed to sell them for. The suit also claimed that GNC charged high "reset fees" to franchisees when there is new signage that needs to be changed in the store or an image facelift that must be done by GNC corporate. A similar lawsuit was filed again in an article written on October 20, 2004.

In February 2015, New York Attorney General Eric Schneiderman sent cease and desist letters to GNC and other major retailers due to concerning laboratory tests regarding the accuracy of the claimed contents of supplements. GNC shortly afterwards removed some stock from sales while working with the Attorney General. In September 2016, GNC, the New York Office of the Attorney General, and other supplement retailers ultimately came to an agreement and retailers are now accomplishing more robust testing of supplements to ensure accurate labeling.

In October 2015, the Attorney General of Oregon filed a lawsuit against GNC alleging that the company knowingly sold products containing the ingredients picamilon and BMPEA, which are banned by the FDA.

On February 2, 2017, GNC threatened to sue the Fox Broadcasting Company for "significant economic and reputational damages, lost opportunities, and consequential damages", after an advertisement for the chain was blocked from airing during Super Bowl LI. Despite repeated approvals by Fox, the network stated that the ad had been vetoed by the National Football League because of GNC's placement on an NFLPA blacklist for selling products that contain substances banned by the NFL. The letter of intent claimed that Fox had not informed them of any such rules when they purchased the ad time, and cited that the purchase induced them to "spend millions of dollars in production costs and in the development of a national, coordinated marketing and rebranding campaign" around the commercial. The NFL itself does not prohibit ads for health stores unless they contain references to specific prohibited products; the GNC ad only contained motivational themes and no references to its products.

References

External links
 

Companies formerly listed on the New York Stock Exchange
Companies traded over-the-counter in the United States
Health food stores
Food retailers of the United States
Retail companies established in 1935
Sports nutrition and bodybuilding supplement companies
Nutritional supplement companies of the United States
Companies based in Pittsburgh
1935 establishments in Pennsylvania
2011 initial public offerings
American companies established in 1935
Companies that filed for Chapter 11 bankruptcy in 2020
2020 mergers and acquisitions
American subsidiaries of foreign companies